Katharina Melissa Lehnert (born 18 February 1994) is a Filipino-German former tennis player. Lehnert has a German father and a Filipino mother; she represented Germany until 2013 when she decided to represent the Philippines.

Lehnert has a career-high WTA singles ranking of No. 389, achieved on 22 April 2013. On 24 August 2015, she peaked at No. 451 of the doubles rankings. In her career, she won four singles titles and three doubles titles on the ITF Circuit.

Playing for Philippines Fed Cup team, Lehnert has a win–loss record of 15–10.

ITF Circuit finals

Singles: 8 (4 titles, 4 runner-ups)

Doubles: 13 (3 titles, 10 runner-ups)

Fed Cup participation

Singles (7–0)

Doubles (3–1)

External links
 
 
 
 Katharina Lehnert Filipino Female Tennis Player

1994 births
Living people
Filipino female tennis players
German female tennis players
German sportspeople of Filipino descent
Citizens of the Philippines through descent
Tennis players at the 2014 Asian Games
Tennis players at the 2018 Asian Games
Southeast Asian Games silver medalists for the Philippines
Southeast Asian Games bronze medalists for the Philippines
Southeast Asian Games medalists in tennis
Competitors at the 2017 Southeast Asian Games
Asian Games competitors for the Philippines
Tennis people from Lower Saxony